Sir John Edward Lloyd (5 May 1861 – 20 June 1947) was a Welsh historian, He was the author of the first serious history of the country's formative years, A History of Wales from the Earliest Times to the Edwardian Conquest (1911).

Another of his great works was Owain Glendower: Owain Glyn Dŵr (1931). For his achievements in the field, he was made a Knight Bachelor in 1934. Under his editorship, the first edition of the Dictionary of Welsh Biography was compiled, though not published until after his death (1950).

Works

 - in Welsh

See also
Cymru Fydd

Sources
Welsh Biography Online

External links
 

1861 births
1947 deaths
Alumni of Lincoln College, Oxford
20th-century Welsh historians
Members of the Cambrian Archaeological Association
19th-century Welsh historians
Welsh politicians
Welsh book editors
Celtic studies scholars
Historians of Wales
Knights Bachelor